Elizabeth Murray  is a British general practitioner and professor of e-health and primary care at University College London. In 2003 she established the eHealth Unit at UCL where she is co-director, and she is also Deputy Director of the UCL Institute of Healthcare Engineering.

Education 
Murray graduated with a B.A. in Physiological Sciences from St Hilda's College, Oxford in 1981, followed by an MSc in Clinical Medicine from Wolfson College, Oxford in 1982. In 2001 Murray was awarded a PhD in Medical Education from the University of Maastricht.

Career and research 
Murray's research focuses on the use of digital health to improve health and health care. She has a specific focus on the development, evaluation and implementation of digital health interventions. Murray's research is highly interdisciplinary, and involves collaboration with human computer interaction and computer scientists, biomedical and health service research methods. 

In 2001, Murray was awarded a Harkness Fellowship in Health Care Policy at the University of California, San Francisco. On her return to the UK, Murray was awarded a Department of Health Career Scientist Award (2002-07). In 2003, Murray set up the UCL eHealth Unit focused on multidisciplinary research in eHealth. With colleagues at the eHealth Unit, Murray set up  a not-for-profit Community Interest Company, HeLP Digital, to disseminate evidence-based digital health interventions developed at UCL across the NHS and internationally. 

Through HeLP Digital, Murray developed a programme to help people with Type 2 diabetes by providing evidence-based information and support online (HeLP-Diabetes), with funding by the NIHR. NHS England announced it will be rolling the HeLP-Diabetes programme nationally in 2020, following trials across 11 areas of the UK.

Murray is a member of the Steering Group for Public Health England workstream on evaluation of digital health interventions, a member of the NHSE Diabetes Programme Board, and a member of the Public Health England Behavioural Science Advisory Board.

References 

British general practitioners
Women medical researchers
Alumni of St Hilda's College, Oxford
Year of birth missing (living people)
Living people
British women medical doctors
21st-century British medical doctors
Alumni of Wolfson College, Oxford
Maastricht University alumni
British expatriates in the Netherlands
Fellows of the Royal College of General Practitioners
Fellows of the Royal College of Physicians
Fellows of the Higher Education Academy
Academics of University College London